Elizaveta Yuriyivna Ianchuk (born 8 March 1993) is an inactive Ukrainian tennis player. Her younger sister Olga Ianchuk is also a professional tennis player.

Career
Ianchuk has a career-high singles ranking of world No. 258, achieved on 4 April 2016. She also has a career-high doubles ranking of 279 by the WTA achieved on 22 August 2016. Ianchuk has won four singles titles and six doubles titles on tournaments of the ITF Circuit.

Ianchuk made her WTA Tour main-draw debut at the 2015 Baku Cup in the doubles event, partnering Olga Fridman.

ITF finals

Singles: 10 (4–6)

Doubles: 14 (6–8)

External links
 
 

Ukrainian female tennis players
1993 births
Living people
Sportspeople from Kyiv
21st-century Ukrainian women